Anna Elizabeth Haebich,  (born 18 December 1949) is an Australian writer, historian and academic.

Career
Haebich is a John Curtin Distinguished Professor and Senior Research Fellow in the Faculty of Humanities at Curtin University.  She was formerly a Research Intensive Professor at Griffith University and prior to that was the foundation Director of the Centre for Public Culture and Ideas at Griffith University. She also led the Griffith Research Program "Creative for Life" that addressed creativity across cultures and generations   and was the Griffith University Orbicom UNESCO Chair.

Haebich was elected a Fellow of the Australian Academy of the Humanities (FAHA) in 2006 and of the Academy of the Social Sciences in Australia (FASSA) in 2007. She has also been a member of the AIATSIS Research Advisory Committee.

Haebich is the author of a number of influential and award winning books focusing on Indigenous history and Australia's discriminatory policies, including For Their Own Good: Aborigines and Government in the South West of Western Australia 1900 to 1940 (1988) and Broken Circles Fragmenting Indigenous Families 1800–2000 (2000). For Their Own Good won the 1989 Western Australian Premier's Literature Award for Non-Fiction and Broken Circles received a number of awards including 'NSW Premiers Book of the Year 2001 and 2001 Stanner Award from AIATSIS.

Haebich was one of a group of writers involved in unraveling the Moore River Native Settlement history, and the legacy of A.O. Neville on generations of indigenous Australians. Susan Maushart, Rosemary van den Berg, Jack Davis, and Doris Pilkington.

More recent publications investigate the personal history of individuals that lived in Western Australia including Murdering Stepmothers The Execution of Martha Rendell and A Boy's Short Life Warren Braedon/Louis Johnson.

The latest publication Dancing in the Shadows – A History of Nyungar Performance (2018), "explores the power of Indigenous performance pitted against the forces of settler colonialism."

Publications
 Haebich, A. (2018) Dancing in the Shadows – Histories of Nyungar Performance  UWA Publishing.
 Haebich, A. (2013) A Boy's Short Life Warren Braedon/Louis Johnson – co-authored with Steve Mickler:  UWA Publishing.
 Haebich, A. (2010) Murdering Stepmothers The Execution of Martha Rendell, Nedlands: UWA Publishing.
 Haebich, A. (2008) Spinning the Dream Assimilation in Australia, Fremantle: Fremantle Press.
 Haebich, A. (2004) Clearing the wheat belt. Erasing the indigenous presence in the southwest of Western Australia, The Genocide Question.
 Haebich, A. (2003) Many Voices Reflections on Experiences of Indigenous Child Separation. Canberra: National Library of Australia.
 Haebich, A. (2000) Broken Circles Fragmenting Indigenous Families 1800–2000, Fremantle: Fremantle Arts Centre Press.
 Haebich, A. (1988) For Their Own Good: Aborigines and Government in the South West of Western Australia 1900 to 1940, Nedlands: UWA Press.

References

External links
 Becoming Queensland by Anna Haebich, a 4 min 27 sec video, published by State Library of Queensland as part of Storylines:Q150 digital stories: available as MP4 Windows Media transcript.
 

1949 births
Living people
Australian women historians
Australian women writers
Curtin University alumni
Academic staff of Curtin University
Academic staff of Edith Cowan University
Fellows of the Academy of the Social Sciences in Australia
Fellows of the Australian Academy of the Humanities
Academic staff of Griffith University
Historians from Western Australia
Murdoch University alumni
Academic staff of Murdoch University
People from Toowoomba
Recipients of the Centenary Medal
University of Western Australia alumni